Charter is a 2020 Swedish drama film directed by Amanda Kernell. It was selected as the Swedish entry for the Best International Feature Film at the 93rd Academy Awards, but it did not make the shortlist.

Plot
While awaiting on the final custody verdict following her divorce, a mother abducts her two children, taking them to Tenerife.

Cast
 Ane Dahl Torp as Alice
 Sverrir Gudnason as Mattias
 Troy Lundkvist as Vincent
 Tintin Poggats Sarri as Elina
 Johan Bäckström as Simon
 Eva Melander as Margit

See also
 List of submissions to the 93rd Academy Awards for Best International Feature Film
 List of Swedish submissions for the Academy Award for Best International Feature Film

References

External links
 

2020 films
2020 drama films
Films set in the Canary Islands
Films shot in the Canary Islands
Swedish drama films
2020s Swedish-language films